The 2015 Mekong Club Championship was the 2nd season of the Mekong Club Championship. Five teams entered as respective domestic league winners from Cambodia, Laos, Myanmar, Thailand and Vietnam. The championship is sponsored by Toyota.

Qualified teams

Venues

First round
 Times listed are local (UTC+7:00) and (UTC+6:30)

Knockout stage

Bracket

Semi-final match

Final match

Winners

Goalscorers

5 goals
  Chan Vathanaka

2 goals
  Adilson dos Santos
  Esoh Omogba

1 goals
  Frederic Pooda
  Kazuo Homma
  David Htan
  Kyaw Ko Ko
  Yan Aung Kyaw
  Samuel Ajayi
  Nsi Amougou
  Andrés Túñez
  Nguyen Anh Duc

References

External links
 Official site

2015
2015 in Thai football
2015 in Vietnamese football
2015 in Burmese football
2015 in Laotian football
2015 in Cambodian football